Lauri Iivari Kaukamaa (22 August 1907 - 20 April 1990; surname until 1929 Munter) was a Finnish educationist, civil servant and politician, born in Pori. He was a member of the Parliament of Finland from 1948 to 1951, representing the National Coalition Party.

References

1907 births
1990 deaths
People from Pori
People from Turku and Pori Province (Grand Duchy of Finland)
National Coalition Party politicians
Members of the Parliament of Finland (1948–51)